Miss America 1937, the 11th Miss America pageant, was held at the Steel Pier in Atlantic City, New Jersey on Saturday, September 11, 1937. Shortly after being presented as Miss America, the newly crowned 17-year-old winner, Bette Cooper, left Atlantic City and returned home. Once there, she missed scheduled appointments on her first day as Miss America, as well as a theater appearance and a trip to Hollywood.  Her father cited illness as the reason. Though not placing in the top five, representatives from different areas of New York captured three of the semi-finalist positions.

Results

Awards
Best Evening Gown

 Bertrand Island - Bette Cooper

Preliminary awards

Contestants

References

Secondary sources

External links
 Miss America official website

1937
1937 in the United States
1937 in New Jersey
September 1937 events
Events in Atlantic City, New Jersey